Ruslan Sirota is a Grammy Award winning pianist, composer, and producer.

Early life
Ruslan was born in Uman, Ukraine to a Jewish family on November 4, 1980. His father, Yefim, who was an active local guitarist, introduced him to music at an early age. Picking up guitar around the age of four, Ruslan transitioned to piano around the age of seven. In 1990, his family moved to Israel, where he continued to study piano at the Bat-Yam music school. At approximately 14, Ruslan discovered jazz, instantly showing interest. By the age of 16, he was the "wunderkind" keyboardist for the then-popular Israeli jazz fusion band, "Confusion". With Confusion, he toured Israel and made several appearances at the Red Sea Jazz Festival.

At 18, Ruslan auditioned for the Berklee College of Music, where he received full tuition scholarship, and moved to Boston in January 2000. During his studies at Berklee, Ruslan displayed growing interest in R&B, funk and soul music, playing with local artists and eventually becoming the resident keyboardist in a club called "Wally's Jazz Café".

Later life and career
Circa 2004, Ruslan joined the Stanley Clarke band and moved to Los Angeles, thus marking the beginning of his professional career.

Since then, Ruslan has been touring, performing and recording with major artists (in addition to Clarke), such as Black Eyed Peas, Kamasi Washington, Seal, Josh Groban, Ne-Yo, Thundercat, Chick Corea, George Duke, Marcus Miller, Al Jarreau, Victor Wooten, Eric Benét, Rachelle Ferrell, Larry Carlton, Los Angeles Philharmonic and countless others. Ruslan released his self-titled debut album, featuring Clarke, Corea and George Duke as special guests, on October 24, 2011. The album was produced by Ruslan and Clarke, recorded at Clarke's production company, Roxboro Entertainment Group, mixed by Yan Perchuk at Vibrant Productions, released on Bungalo Records and distributed by Universal Music Group Distribution.

Ruslan is also a board member of the Magic Music Foundation, a non-profit organization devoted to granting scholarships to music students worldwide, regardless of their choice of music teachers and/or schools.

Discography

As leader
2011: Ruslan
2019: A Lifetime Away

As sideman or guest
1998: Customade by Confusion
2007: The Toys of Men by Stanley Clarke
2008: Thunder by S.M.V.
2008: Conflict by Sy Smith
2009: The Quiet Hype by Jupiter Rising
2010: The Stanley Clarke Band by Stanley Clarke (also contributing the composition "Soldier")
2010: Lost in Time by Eric Benét
2011: Platinum Hit: The Winning Songs, Season One
 2013: In This Life by Virgil Donati
 2015: Stages by Josh Groban
 2018: Quartet by Bob Reynolds

References

External links
Ruslan Sirota's official webpage
Ruslan Sirota's YouTube channel
Chick Corea Band's great JB performance + tour schedule!
Itay Lasky at New Stage.co.il commemorates the music of Confusion (in Hebrew)

1980 births
Living people
People from Uman
Ukrainian Jews
Ukrainian emigrants to Israel
Berklee College of Music alumni
American jazz pianists
American male pianists
21st-century American keyboardists
21st-century American pianists
21st-century American male musicians
American male jazz musicians